Mirna Jukić (born 9 April 1986) is a retired Austrian swimmer who won a bronze medal in both short course and long course at the world championships in swimming. She is trained by her father Željko Jukić, a former basketball player. She has had numerous European and World championship successes.

Family
Jukić was born in Novi Sad, Serbia and grew up in Vukovar, Croatia. In November 1991, the family moved to Zagreb, and her father started training her at Mladost in 1996. Her brother, Dinko Jukić, with whom she was trained early on, also became an international-level swimmer. In the autumn of 1999, the family moved to Vienna, Austria, and the same year Mirna became an Austrian citizen. Her brother became an Austrian citizen in 2000, while the parents remained Croatian citizens.

Olympic career
At the 2008 Olympics Jukić garnered a bronze medal in the 100 m breaststroke (1:07.34); she also swam the 200 m breaststroke. At the 2009 World Aquatics Championships she won the bronze medal in the 200 m breaststroke final with a time of 2:21.97.

Training
For the 2004 and 2008 Olympics, Jukić trained at The Race Club, a swimming club founded by Olympic swimmers Gary Hall, Jr. and his father, Gary Hall, Sr. The Race Club, originally known as "The World Team," was designed to serve as a training group for elite swimmers across the world in preparation for the 2000 Sydney Olympic Games. To be able to train with the Race Club, one must either have been ranked in the top 20 in the world the past 3 calendar years or top 3 in their nation in the past year. The Race Club included such well known swimmers as Roland Mark Schoeman, Mark Foster, Ryk Neethling, Ricardo Busquets and Therese Alshammar.

Broadcasting

In January 2010, Mirna Jukić was the host of the Croatian team in Graz for the 2010 European Men's Handball Championship.

See also
 The Race Club

References

External links

  
 
 Mirna Jukić Photo Gallery at The Race Club

1986 births
Living people
Austrian female breaststroke swimmers
Croatian female swimmers
Swimmers at the 2004 Summer Olympics
Swimmers at the 2008 Summer Olympics
Olympic swimmers of Austria
Olympic bronze medalists for Austria
Croatian emigrants to Austria
Olympic bronze medalists in swimming
World Aquatics Championships medalists in swimming
Swimmers from Vienna
Medalists at the FINA World Swimming Championships (25 m)
European Aquatics Championships medalists in swimming
Medalists at the 2008 Summer Olympics
Universiade medalists in swimming
Sportspeople from Novi Sad
Universiade bronze medalists for Austria
Medalists at the 2007 Summer Universiade
Austrian people of Croatian descent 
Croats of Vojvodina